Mutya ng Pilipinas 2010, the 42nd edition of Mutya ng Pilipinas, Inc., was held on Aug. 28th, 2010 at Resorts World Manila Grand Theater in Newport City, Pasay, Metro Manila. Carla Jenina Lizardo, the winner of Mutya ng Pilipinas Intercontinental 2010, Barbara Salvador, Mutya ng Pilipinas Tourism International 2010 and  Christi Lynn “Ashley” McGarry named as Mutya ng Pilipinas Asia Pacific 2010.

Results
Color keys

Special Titles

Special Awards

Contestants

Crossovers from Major National Pageants prior to this date
 Mutya #19 Barbara Salvador was Binibining Pilipinas 2009 Top 10 semifinalist
 Mutya #24 Anna Gabriela Estimada was Miss Philippines Earth 2007 candidate

Post-Pageant Notes

 Mutya ng Pilipinas Intercontinental, Carla Jenina Lizardo was unable to compete at Miss Intercontinental 2010 due to a family situation
 Mutya ng Pilipinas Asia Pacific, Christi Lynn McGarry replaced Carla Jenina Lizardo and competed at Miss Intercontinental 2010 in Punta Cana, Dominican Republic and placed Top 15 semifinalist  She then crossed over to the Binibining Pilipinas pageant in 2015 where she was crowned Bb Pilipinas - Intercontinental 2015 and placed first runner-up at Miss Intercontinental 2015, making her the first and only beauty queen to join the same international pageant twice.
 Mutya ng Pilipinas Tourism International, Barbara Salvador competed at Miss Tourism International 2010 in Kuala Lumpur, Malaysia and placed 3rd runner-up
 Mutya #1, Suzette Hernandez became Miss Supranational Canada 2013 and was Miss Supranational 2013 Top 20 semifinalist

References

External links
 Official Mutya ng Pilipinas website
  Mutya ng Pilipinas 2010 is on!

2010
2010 beauty pageants
2010 in the Philippines